A Dead Poem is the fourth full-length album by Greek extreme metal band Rotting Christ.

The band slowed down their tempos significantly and added occasional usage of acoustic guitars and regional music, making this particular record one of their more mainstream of releases, and the farthest removed from black metal music styles.

Moonspell's Fernando Ribeiro contributed backing vocals to the track "Among Two Storms".

It was produced at Woodhouse Studios in Hagen, Germany by Xy, programmer/percussionist for Samael, who also contributed keyboards to some tracks.

Track listing
 "Sorrowfull Farewell" – 4:52
 "Among Two Storms" – 4:09
 "A Dead Poem" – 4:08
 "Out of Spirits" – 4:06
 "As If by Magic" – 5:51
 "Full Colour Is the Night" – 4:47
 "Semigod" – 4:39
 "Ten Miles High" – 4:34
 "Between Times" – 5:03
 "Ira Incensus" – 5:16

Credits
Sakis Tolis – guitar, vocals 
Costas Vassilakopoulos – guitar 
Andreas Lagios – bass 
Georgios Tolias – keyboards 
Themis Tolis – drums, backing vocals

References

1997 albums
Rotting Christ albums